George Albert Richards (11 August 1888 – 8 May 1928) was an Australian rules footballer who played with Melbourne in the Victorian Football League (VFL).

Notes

External links 

1888 births
1928 deaths
Australian rules footballers from Victoria (Australia)
Melbourne Football Club players
People educated at Wesley College (Victoria)